The Herkimer County shootings were a shooting spree that took place on March 13, 2013, in Herkimer County, New York.

Incident 
Kurt Myers, a 64-year-old resident of the village of Mohawk, set fire to his apartment before 9:30am and proceeded to a barber shop in Mohawk. Myers briefly spoke to the barbershop owner John Seymour before opening fire, killing two customers and injuring Seymour and another customer. He proceeded to a car wash in the nearby village of Herkimer, where he killed an employee and a customer.

Myers was pursued by police and eventually cornered in an abandoned bar in Herkimer. The standoff lasted overnight. Police entered the building around 8am the next day. Myers shot and killed a police dog named "Ape" and the police returned fire, killing him.

Aftermath 
No motive for the shootings is known. At the time of the shooting, Myers had no savings, no job, and was maxed out on all his credit cards: he also had very little furniture in his apartment. Myers had no previous criminal record aside from a 1973 arrest for drunken driving. Neighbors said he never had visitors or friends: the few who were familiar described him as an "odd little man" who rarely spoke.

The shootings occurred a few months after the signing of the New York Secure Ammunition and Firearms Enforcement Act of 2013, or NY SAFE Act. The act was discussed in the light of these shootings, and vice versa.

The building where the stand-off took place was demolished in 2015 after a series of minor collapses.

References 

2013 active shooter incidents in the United States
2013 murders in the United States
Mass murder in 2013
2013 mass shootings in the United States
Spree shootings in the United States
Attacks in the United States in 2013
March 2013 events in the United States
Mass shootings in New York (state)
Mass shootings in the United States
Mass murder in the United States
Animal cruelty incidents